The Piedmont Environmental Council (PEC) is a Virginia-based non-profit organization headquartered in Warrenton, Virginia, United States. PEC's mission is to promote and protect the Virginia Piedmont's rural economy, natural resources, history and beauty.

Environmental organizations based in Virginia